In Greek mythology, Canes (Ancient Greek: Κάνῃ means 'basket of reed') was a king of Phocis during the voyage of the Argonauts. His father was Cephalus, son of King Deion and Diomede. Canes married Evadne, daughter of King Pelias of Iolcus. Their marriage was arranged by the hero Jason in compensation for the death of the bride's father.

Notes

References 

 Apollodorus, The Library with an English Translation by Sir James George Frazer, F.B.A., F.R.S. in 2 Volumes, Cambridge, MA, Harvard University Press; London, William Heinemann Ltd. 1921. ISBN 0-674-99135-4. Online version at the Perseus Digital Library. Greek text available from the same website.
 Diodorus Siculus, The Library of History translated by Charles Henry Oldfather. Twelve volumes. Loeb Classical Library. Cambridge, Massachusetts: Harvard University Press; London: William Heinemann, Ltd. 1989. Vol. 3. Books 4.59–8. Online version at Bill Thayer's Web Site
 Diodorus Siculus, Bibliotheca Historica. Vol 1-2. Immanel Bekker. Ludwig Dindorf. Friedrich Vogel. in aedibus B. G. Teubneri. Leipzig. 1888–1890. Greek text available at the Perseus Digital Library.

Princes in Greek mythology
Kings of Phocis
Kings in Greek mythology
Phocian characters in Greek mythology